Mimostenellipsis is a genus of beetles in the family Cerambycidae, containing the following species:

 Mimostenellipsis albertisi Breuning, 1956
 Mimostenellipsis densepunctata (Breuning, 1963)
 Mimostenellipsis pilosa (Breuning, 1963)

References

Acanthocinini